Lingshui may refer to:

Lingshui Li Autonomous County, county in Hainan, China
Lingshui (village), village in Jinjiang, Fujian, China